Charis Global School is a private National Plus school in Lippo Cikarang, Bekasi City, West Java, Indonesia. Essentially, the school programs are developed into three categories: Early Childhood Program (Nursery 1-2 and Kindergarten 1-2), Primary Program (Grade 1 to 6) and Secondary Program (Grade 7 to 9).

The school provides an English-medium education system besides Bahasa Indonesia as the language of instruction for Indonesian-based subjects. The student composition is primarily Indonesian but includes other nationalities. There are expatriate students mainly from Korea, Japan, China, Malaysia, and India.

History 
Charis Global School was established in 2007 for local and expatriate students living in Lippo Cikarang.

The school has grown rapidly after initially opening only a pre-school level that offers the Early Childhood Programs. In 2009, the school started its Primary Program. The school changed its name to Charis Global School from Charis Global International School to comply with the Indonesian government's regulations on prohibiting the use of word "international" in school names.

By 2016, the school had expanded into its Secondary Program.

Today the school has a total staff of about 70, out of which, 55 are teaching staff.

Curriculum 

Charis Global School follows the National Curriculum prescribed by the Indonesian Ministry of Education and Culture in Primary and Secondary levels, and also adopts the Singapore education curriculum for English-based subjects such as Math, Science, English Language as well as Mandarin.

The school uses a wide range of teaching and learning methods to promote effective and engaged learning. For example, students are engaged in project-based learning. They also put up presentations to share their learning with their peers.

The school encourages participation in competitions, such as Singapore and Asian Schools Math Olympiads (SASMO), American Mathematics Olympiads (AMO), National Science Olympiad (OSN), etc.

Notable achievements

References 

Lippo Cikarang
National Plus schools
Singaporean international schools in Indonesia
Educational institutions established in 2007
2007 establishments in Indonesia